Ted Fay (22 December 1911 – 2 October 2001) was an Australian rules footballer who played with Essendon in the Victorian Football League (VFL).

Notes

External links 
		

1911 births
2001 deaths
Australian rules footballers from Victoria (Australia)
Essendon Football Club players